Joseph Henabery (January 15, 1888 – February 18, 1976) of Omaha, Nebraska, was a film actor, screenplay writer, and director in the United States. He is best known for his portrayal of Abraham Lincoln in D.W. Griffith's controversial 1915 silent historical epic The Birth of a Nation.

Early years 
Henabery was born in Omaha and raised in Los Angeles. He began acting as an amateur in California. Before he worked in films, Henabery worked for the San Pedro, Los Angeles, Salt Lake Railroad. When he was 25 years old, he became an extra for Universal Pictures.

Career
Henabery's acting career began in The Joke on Yellentown (1914).  From 1914 to 1917 he appeared in seventeen films, including his portrayal of Lincoln in The Birth of a Nation.

Henabery also worked as a second-unit director on Griffith's Intolerance (1916), and supervised the filming of at least one extended sequence that appeared in the film. Henabery also acted as Admiral de Coligny in the Renaissance French portion of the film depicting the St. Bartholomew's Day massacre. Throughout the rest of his career, he worked as a director. From the mid-1920s, and after professional disagreements with both Louis B. Mayer at Metro-Goldwyn-Mayer and Adolph Zukor at Paramount Pictures, Henabery found employment as a director for smaller Hollywood studios. 

In 1931 he joined the Vitaphone studio in New York City, where he directed dozens of short subjects for the next 10 years. Most of them were musicals and comedies, featuring a host of popular singers in 20-minute sketches. Henabery remained with Vitaphone until the New York studio closed in 1940.

Henabery made documentaries and training films as a member of the Army Signal Corps.

As Abraham Lincoln
Although Henabery's impersonation of Lincoln was a masterpiece of facial makeup, the 6'1" (185 cm) Henabery was three inches shorter than the 6'4" (193 cm) Lincoln. Kevin Brownlow's book The Parade's Gone By (1968) contains a photo of Henabery in costume and makeup as Lincoln, seated in a chair with planks placed on the floor under Henabery's feet so that his knees are raised several inches; this effect (with the planks kept off-camera in the movie) made Henabery's legs appear longer than they actually were.

Personal life and death
Henabery and his wife, Lilian, had a daughter and a son. Henabery died on February 18, 1976, aged 88, at the Motion Picture Country House in Los Angeles, California.

Filmography

Director

Actor
The Race War (1915) with Bessie Buskirk

References

External links

1888 births
1976 deaths
American male film actors
American male silent film actors
20th-century American male actors
Male actors from Omaha, Nebraska
Writers from Omaha, Nebraska
American film directors